Grahovo is a South Slavic toponym that may refer to:

In Bosnia and Herzegovina:
 Bosansko Grahovo, a town and municipality
 Grahovo, Velika Kladuša, a village near Velika Kladuša

In Montenegro:
 Grahovo (region), a region between Nikšić and the border with Herzegovina
 Grahovo, Nikšić, a small town and former municipality near Nikšić, also a medieval tribe and an honorary title
 Grahovo, Rožaje, a village near Rožaje
 Church of Saint Nikola, Grahovo

In Serbia:
 Graovo, a village near Leskovac

In Slovenia:
 Grahovo, Cerknica, a village in the Municipality of Cerknica
 Grahovo ob Bači, a village in the Municipality of Tolmin
 Grahovo Brdo, a settlement in the Municipality of Sežana

See also
Grahovo Tribe (Grahovljani)
Battle of Grahovo (1836)
Grahovac
Grahovci

Serbo-Croatian place names